
Year 366 (CCCLXVI) was a common year starting on Sunday of the Julian calendar. At the time, it was known as the Year of the Consulship of Gratianus and Dagalaifus (or, less frequently, year 1119 Ab urbe condita). The denomination 366 for this year has been used since the early medieval period, when the Anno Domini calendar era became the prevalent method in Europe for naming years.

Events 
 By place 
 Roman Empire 
 January 2 – The Alamanni cross the frozen Rhine in large numbers, and invade the Gallic provinces. They capture Alsace and a large part of the Swiss Plateau. 
 April – Battle of Thyatira: Emperor Valens defeats the troops of Procopius, bringing an end to his revolt; Serenianus and Marcellus are killed. Procopius flees the battlefield, but is executed by Valens.
 Valens builds a pontoon bridge across the Danube, and drives the Visigoths farther north, where they will come under pressure from the advancing Huns.
 Winter – Emperor Valentinian I appoints Jovinus, his Master of the Horse (Magister Equitum), general of the army. He defeats the Alamanni in three successive battles, and pushes them out of Gaul.

 By topic 
 Art and Science 
 The Tabula Peutingeriana, a map showing Roman possessions and roads, is created about this time.

 Religion 
 January 31 – Athanasius of Alexandria returns from his fifth exile. He has spent four months in his ancestral tomb outside Alexandria.
 Buddhist monk Lè Zūn has a vision of "golden rays of light shining down on 1,000 Buddhas", resulting in the creation of the Mogao Caves.
 October 1 – Pope Liberius dies after a 14-year reign and is succeeded by Damasus I as 37th pope. Romans unhappy with this choice elect the antipope Ursicinus.

Births 
 January 18 – Valentinianus Galates, Roman emperor (d. 370)
 Yao Xing, Chinese emperor of the Later Qin Dynasty (d. 416)

Deaths 

 May 16 – Ajabel, Christian priest and martyr
 May 27 – Procopius, Roman general and usurper
 August 1 – Leo of Montefeltro, Christian bishop and saint
 September 24 – Liberius, pope of the Catholic Church (b. 310)

Date unknown 
 Acacius of Caesarea, Christian bishop
 Marcellus, Roman general and usurper
 Marinus, Christian hermit and saint (b. 275) 
 Serenianus, Roman general of the Imperial Guard
 Yu Daolian, Chinese empress and wife of Jin Feidi
 Zhi Dun, Chinese Buddhist monk and philosopher (b. 314)

References